The 1942 Fort Totten Redlegs football team represented Fort Totten during the 1942 college football season. The Redlegs compiled a 3–5–1 record, and were ranked No. 18 in the Associated Press post-season poll for service teams. There was some debate about Fort Totten's overall record for the 1942, with multiple sources citing the team had five wins and three losses prior to their contest with Fort Monmouth, and one specifying the team with four wins and three losses.  However, the accounts must be incorrect, given Totten's confirmed tie against Hartwick College at the beginning of the season, and that most accounts recognize the Fort played eight games before Fort Monmouth, which corroborates with the verified number of games for the season.

Schedule

References

 
Fort Totten
Fort Totten Redlegs football seasons
Fort Totten Redlegs football